The Smolensk–Moscow Upland is located in the Yaroslavl, Vladimir, Moscow and Smolensk regions of Russia, as well as the Vitebsk region of Belarus.

Geography 
It stretches from southwest to northeast from the Belarusian city of Orsha to Yuriev-Polsky. It consists of the Smolensk Upland (western part) and the Moscow Uplands (eastern part).

It extends 500 km. Its highest point is 320 m (northeastern part of Smolensk). The terrain is hilly, erosion-moraine. In the west the moraine chain goes to the Belarusian ridge .

The Dnieper (west) and the Volga (east) rivers drain its hill. The watersheds feed three seas: the Baltic (Kasplya → Western Dvina), Black (Dnieper) and the Caspian (the Volga, the Oka River and their tributaries).

Ecology 
It is covered with mixed forests, dominated by spruce and birch. Peat bogs are also present.

Its soils are mainly sod-podzolic, loamy, except for the eastern part of the hill, where more fertile gray forest soil is found. The area is called the Vladimir ( St. George's) Opole.

References

Hills of Russia
Geography of Smolensk Oblast
Geography of Moscow Oblast
Geography of Yaroslavl Oblast
Geography of Vladimir Oblast